Benjamin "Ben" Kvanli (born 5 February 1975) is a Guatemalan-American slalom canoeist who competed in the 1990s and 2000s (decade). He finished 33rd in the K1 event at the 1996 Summer Olympics in Atlanta while representing Guatemala.

World Cup individual podiums

1 Pan American Championship counting for World Cup points

References

USA Canoe/Kayak profile

1975 births
Canoeists at the 1996 Summer Olympics
Guatemalan male canoeists
American male canoeists
Living people
Olympic canoeists of Guatemala